The Best of Broadway is a 60-minute live television anthology series that aired on CBS Television on Wednesdays at 10p.m. Eastern Standard Time from September 15, 1954, to May 4, 1955, for a total of nine episodes. Each show was broadcast live in color from New York City, was an adaptation of a famous Broadway play, and included commercials for Westinghouse featuring Betty Furness. Using a "giant new studio," plays were presented in front of a studio audience, which contributed a Broadway-like element.

This series ran every fourth week, with Pabst Blue Ribbon Bouts being aired the other three weeks. 

The series originated from CBS Television Studio 72 at WCBS-TV. Martin Manulis was the initial producer, and Paul Nickell was the director. David Brookman was in charge of the music. In February 1955, Felix Jackson became the producer when Manulis began producing Climax!.

Episodes

See also
1954-55 United States network television schedule

References

External links

The Best of Broadway list of episodes and cast lists at CTVA

1954 American television series debuts
1955 American television series endings
American live television series
CBS original programming
1950s American anthology television series
English-language television shows